The Associated Catholic Colleges (ACC) is a group of thirteen independent Catholic boys schools in Victoria, Australia. The Association, formed in 1911, and renamed in 1948, provides the basis for interschool sporting and other competitions between member schools.

History
Christian Brothers College (now known as St Mary's College) was one of eighteen schools to participate in the first Combined Secondary Schools Athletics Championship conducted by the Victorian Amateur Athletic Association (VAAA) on 7 November 1902 at the Melbourne Cricket Ground. The Adamson Cup, donated by the headmaster of Wesley College and president of the VAAA, was presented to the winning school. Christian Brothers College East Melbourne (now known as Parade College) was the only Catholic College to ever win the cup in 1910.

The history of sporting competition between Catholic Secondary Schools in Melbourne and Victoria, goes back to 1911, when the Secondary Schools' Championship Meeting was first conducted by the School Amateur Athletic Association of Victoria on 3 November at the East Melbourne Cricket Ground. The colleges that competed in this first competition were the Christian Brothers Colleges of East Melbourne, St Kilda, North Melbourne, South Melbourne, St Patrick's College, Ballarat and Assumption College, Kilmore. This group later became 'The Combined Catholic Schools Association'. The Association was also known as the Associated Catholic Secondary Schools prior to it becoming the Associated Catholic Colleges in 1948. Member colleges took part in an annual athletics meeting, football, handball and tennis competitions. As the competition expanded additional Catholic secondary colleges conducted by other male religious orders such as the De La Salle Brothers, Marist Brothers and others also participated in the competition which included cricket by 1928.

The first swimming carnival for the Associated Catholic Secondary Schools of Victoria was held on 2 March 1932 at the Kew City Baths, with Christian Brothers Colleges of East Melbourne, North Melbourne and St Kilda and De La Salle competing.

In 1940, the Athletics competition was divided into two divisions due to the number of participating colleges. Division 1: CBC Parade, CBC St Kilda, St Joseph's North Melbourne, De La Salle, St Patrick's Ballarat, St Patrick's Sale and Assumption. Division 2: St Kevin's, St. Bede's, St Monica's Essendon, St Joseph's Geelong and St Patrick's East Melbourne.

In 1951, member colleges were divided into the metropolitan (CBC North Melbourne, CBC Parade, CBC St Kilda, De La Salle, St Bede's, St Bernard's and St Kevin's) and country (Assumption, CBC Warrnambool, Marcellin Mt Gambia, Marcellin Camberwell, Marist Bendigo, St Joseph's Geelong, St Patrick's Ballarat and St Patrick's Sale) groups to compete in the athletics championship. The Archbishops Shield for the Division 1 Athletics Champions was awarded to the new Associated Catholic Country Colleges aggregate winners, and the newly donated Old Collegians Shield was awarded for the city colleges aggregate winners. The final Associated Catholic Country Colleges Athletics carnival was held in 1975.

Aims

Schools

Current member schools

Former member schools 

^Country Colleges competition

Possible future member school

Sports

Current 
 Athletics
 Swimming
 Cross Country
 Basketball
 Cricket
 Football
 Golf
 Hockey
 Soccer
 Table Tennis
 Tennis
 Volleyball
 Debating
 Chess
 Badminton
 Bowls (Lawn)

Former 
 Handball

Trophies awarded

Athletics 
The aggregate division 1 winners are presented the Old Collegians Shield.

Swimming 
The aggregate division 1 winners are presented with the Walsh Shield (donated by P S Walsh).

Cross Country 
The aggregate division 1 senior winners are presented with the Brother Bouchard Cup. Joe Bouchard was the founding Principal of Chisholm College, and member of the ACC from 1970 to 1987.

The aggregate division 1 intermediate winners are presented with the Martin Hickey Cup. Martin Hickey was a member of the Parade College staff for over 25 years and Hon. Secretary of the ACC for 10 years.

The aggregate division 1 junior winners are presented with the James Delahunt Cup. The cup was donated by the Ryan Family in memory of James Delahunt, a Year 7 student at De La Salle College who was killed in an accident in 1981. James was an outstanding athlete who won the U/13 ACC Cross-Country.

Carnivals
Students are given the opportunity to participate in a number of carnivals thought the year including Athletics at Lakeside Stadium, Cross Country, and Swimming at Melbourne Sports and Aquatic Centre.

Academic events
Students can also become involved in events conducted off the field such as Chess, Debating and the Performing Arts.

See also 
 List of schools in Victoria

References

External links 
 Associated Catholic Colleges

 
Australian school sports associations